Windsor Township may refer to the following places:

 Windsor Township, Shelby County, Illinois
 Windsor Township, Fayette County, Iowa
 Windsor Township, Cowley County, Kansas
 Windsor Township, Eaton County, Michigan (Windsor Charter Township, Michigan)
 Windsor Township, Traverse County, Minnesota
 Windsor Township, Jefferson County, Missouri
 Windsor Township, Henry County, Missouri
 Windsor Township, New Jersey, former township divided into:
 East Windsor Township, Mercer County, New Jersey
 West Windsor Township, Mercer County, New Jersey
 Windsor Township, Bertie County, North Carolina
 Winston Township, Forsyth County, North Carolina
 Windsor Township, Stutsman County, North Dakota
 Windsor Township, Ashtabula County, Ohio
 Windsor Township, Lawrence County, Ohio
 Windsor Township, Morgan County, Ohio
Windsor Township, Pennsylvania
 Windsor Township, Berks County, Pennsylvania
 Windsor Township, York County, Pennsylvania
 and also: Lower Windsor Township, York County, Pennsylvania

See also 
 Windsor (disambiguation)
 Winsor Township (disambiguation)

Township name disambiguation pages